Dotarizine is a drug used in the treatment of migraine, which acts as a calcium channel blocker, and also as an antagonist at the 5HT2A receptor, and to a lesser extent at the 5HT1A and 5HT2C receptors. The anti-migraine action is thought to be due to its action as a vasodilator, but it also has some anxiolytic effects and blocks amnesia produced by electroconvulsive shock in animals.

References 

Antimigraine drugs
Calcium channel blockers
Cyclizines
Ketals
Serotonin receptor antagonists